Malanyu is a town approximately  west of the city of Zunhua, Hebei, which administrates the town, and about  from the Forbidden City in Beijing. It hosts the Eastern Qing Tombs, a site that is the final resting place of some of the Qing emperors and empresses. The  site, known more widely as the Eastern Qing Tombs, is the burial place for 5 emperors, 15 empresses and 136 imperial concubines within 15 tombs, including the Shunzhi Emperor (1638–1661), the Kangxi Emperor (1654–1722), the Qianlong Emperor (1711–1799), and Empress Dowager Cixi (1835–1908).

History

Ming Dynasty 

Qing Dynasty 
While on a hunting trip, Emperor Shunzhi of the Qing Dynasty, allegedly awestruck by the area's beauty, declared that he wished to be buried there. His successor, Emperor Kangxi, began the construction of tombs on the site, now known as the Eastern Qing Tombs, in 1663. Emperor Kangxi, along with a team of both Manchu and Han planners, planned out the site, which includes a number of pathways, towers, temples, pavilions, arches, and sculptures. Emperor Kangxi, after his reign, was buried at the site with his concubines.

1928 Robbery 
In 1928, the Eastern Qing Tombs were robbed in a large-scale looting orchestrated by local warlord Sun Dianying, and his subordinate, Tan Wenjiang. Despite widespread outrage at the looting, even by top Chinese officials, Sun faced no reprocussions.

Administrative divisions
Malanyu is divided into 1 neighborhood committee and 25 administrative villages. There are 30 natural villages in Malanyu.

Demographics 
Malanyu is one of the two minority-majority towns in Zunhua, with Han Chinese constituting only 13% of the town's population. While most of the people in Malanyu are ethnically Manchu, there are also significant Mongol and Hui populations.

References 

Township-level divisions of Hebei
Tangshan